The Dhivehi Qaumee Party was a political party in the Maldives. It was registered with the Election Commission on 5 September 2008 and was dissolved in 2013.

The party's 2008 Presidential candidate was Dr. Hassan Saeed. His running mate was Dr. Ahmed Shaheed. Dr. Hassan was the former attorney general of Maldives during Maumoon Abdul Gayoom's term. Shaheed was Foreign Minister during Maumoon term and was also Foreign Minister in Nasheed's cabinet.

References

National Alliance
Political parties established in 2008